The education system in Liechtenstein is similar to the Swiss education system.

The literacy rate of Liechtenstein is 100%.

Elementary and secondary schools 
There are nine public high schools in the country. These include:
 Liechtensteinisches Gymnasium in Vaduz. 
Realschule Vaduz and Oberschule Vaduz, in the Schulzentrum Mühleholz II in Vaduz
 Realschule Schaan and Sportschule Liechtenstein in Schaan

Tertiary education
Within Liechtenstein, there are four main centres for higher education:
 University of Liechtenstein
 Private University in the Principality of Liechtenstein
 Liechtenstein Institute
 International Academy of Philosophy, Liechtenstein

International comparisons 
In 2006 Programme for International Student Assessment report, coordinated by the Organisation for Economic Co-operation and Development, ranked Liechtenstein's education as the 10th best in the world. In 2012, Liechtenstein had the highest PISA-scores of any European country.

Sources

External links
 School Network Liechtenstein